Agathosma elegans is a plant species in the genus Agathosma found in South Africa (Cape of Good Hope).

References

External links 

Zanthoxyloideae
Plants described in 1830
Flora of South Africa